Blastobasis mpala is a moth in the family Blastobasidae. It is found in Kenya, where it is known from savanna habitat in the central highlands.

The length of the forewings is 7.1–8.2 mm. The forewings are pale yellowish brown intermixed with pale brown scales and a few brown scales. The hindwings are pale brown.

Etymology
The species is named in honour of the Mpala Research Centre.

References

Endemic moths of Kenya
Moths described in 2010
Blastobasis
Moths of Africa